Associazione Calcio Milan is an Italian professional football club based in Milan. The club was founded in December 1899 as Milan Foot-Ball and Cricket Club, and played their first competitive match on 15 April 1900, when they entered the semi-final of the 1900 Italian Football Championship. Since playing their first competitive match, more than 900 players have made a competitive first-team appearance for the club, of whom over 150 players have made at least 100 appearances (including substitute appearances); those players are listed here.

Milan's record appearance-maker is Paolo Maldini, who made 902 appearances over his 25 seasons at the club from 1985 to 2009. Gunnar Nordahl is the club's top goalscorer with 221 goals in 268 appearances. Four other players have made more than 500 appearances: Franco Baresi (719), Alessandro Costacurta (663), Gianni Rivera (658) and Mauro Tassotti (583). Nordahl is the only player to have scored over 200 goals for Milan, while nine more players have scored at least 100.

List of players

Appearances and goals are for first-team competitive matches only, including domestic league (Serie A, Serie B, Divisione Nazionale, Prima Divisione, Prima Categoria), domestic cup (Coppa Italia, Supercoppa Italiana, Torneo Estivo del 1986) UEFA competition (European Cup/Champions League, UEFA Cup/Europa League, Cup Winners' Cup, Super Cup, Intercontinental Cup), pre-UEFA European competition (Latin Cup, Inter-Cities Fairs Cup, Mitropa Cup, Coppa dell'Amicizia, Cup of the Alps) and FIFA Club World Cup matches; wartime matches are regarded as unofficial and are excluded.
Players are listed according to the date of their first team debut for the club.

Statistics correct as of match played 18 March 2023

Table headers
 Nationality – If a player played international football, the country or countries he played for are shown. Otherwise, the player's nationality is given as his citizenship of birth (or the corresponding one at the time they played for Milan).
 Milan career – The year of the player's first appearance for Milan to the year of his last appearance.

Club captains
Since 1899, 45 players have held the position of club captain for Milan. The first club captain was David Allison, who filled the role for the inaugural season. The longest-serving club captain is Franco Baresi, who captained the club from 1982 to 1997. Baresi also has the distinction of having won the most trophies as club captain, with 18; he won five Serie A tiles, five Italian Super Cups, three European Cup/Champions League titles, three European Super Cups and two Intercontinental Cups.

Honours
List of players who won at least ten trophies with Milan:

Notes

References
General
 
 

Specific

Lists of association football players by club in Italy
Players
Association football player non-biographical articles